The 1919 Bothwell by-election was held on 16 July 1919.  The by-election was held due to the death of the incumbent Coalition Conservative MP, David Henderson Macdonald.  It was won by the Labour candidate John Robertson.

References

1919 in Scotland
1910s elections in Scotland
1919 elections in the United Kingdom
Politics of South Lanarkshire
By-elections to the Parliament of the United Kingdom in Scottish constituencies